The 1995 Infiniti Open was a men's tennis tournament held at the Los Angeles Tennis Center in Los Angeles, California, United States. The tournament was played on hard court and was held from July 31 through August 7, 1995. Second-seeded Michael Stich won the singles title.

Finals

Singles

 Michael Stich defeated  Thomas Enqvist, 6–7(7–9), 7–6(7–4), 6–2
It was Stich's first title of the year and 17th of his career.

Doubles

 Brent Haygarth /  Kent Kinnear defeated  Scott Davis /  Goran Ivanišević, 6–4, 7–6

References

External links
 ITF tournament edition details

Infiniti Open
Los Angeles Open (tennis)
Infiniti Open
Infiniti Open
Infiniti Open
Infiniti Open